James Edward Oberg (born November 7, 1944) is an American space journalist and historian, regarded as an expert on the Russian and Chinese space programs. He had a 22-year career as a space engineer in NASA specializing in orbital rendezvous. Oberg is an author of ten books and more than a thousand articles on space flight. He gave many explanations of UFO phenomena in the popular press. He is also a consultant in spaceflight operations and safety.

Early life and education 
James Oberg was born in New York City on November 7, 1944.

He received a B.A. in Mathematics from Ohio Wesleyan University in 1966, a M.S. in applied mathematics (astrodynamics) from Northwestern University in 1969 (where he was also a NASA Trainee) and a M.S. in computer science from University of New Mexico in 1972.

US Air Force 
At Northwestern University he started Ph.D. work in Mathematics, but was called to active duty by the United States Air Force in 1970. There he worked with modeling laser and nuclear weapons and in the years 1972–1975, while working in the Department of Defense Computer Institute, he helped design and test ARPANET, ancestor of the Internet.

NASA 
After service in the United States Air Force, he joined NASA in 1975, where he worked until 1997 at Johnson Space Center on the Space Shuttle program. He worked in the Mission Control Center for several Space Shuttle missions from STS-1 on, specializing in orbital rendezvous techniques. This culminated in planning the orbit for the STS-88 mission, the first International Space Station (ISS) assembly flight.

During the 1990s, he was involved in NASA studies of the Soviet space program, with particular emphasis on safety aspects; these had often been covered up or downplayed, and with the advent of the ISS and the Shuttle–Mir programs, NASA was keen to study them as much as possible. He privately published several books on the Soviet (and later Russian) programs, and became one of the few Western specialists on Russian space history.

He has often been called to testify before the US Congress on the Russian space program.

In 1997 he voluntarily resigned from NASA and started a full-time free-lance career. Currently he works as a consultant in spaceflight operations and safety and as a space journalist.

Author and journalist 
As a journalist, Oberg writes for several publications, mostly online; he was previously a space correspondent or commentator for UPI, ABC News and currently MSNBC, often in an on-air role. He is a Fellow of the skeptical organization CSICOP and a consultant to its magazine Skeptical Inquirer.

He has written more than a thousand magazine and newspaper articles, including such magazines as The Wall Street Journal, USA Today, Scientific American, OMNI, Popular Science, Popular Mechanics, New Scientist, IEEE Spectrum, Air Force Magazine, Star and Sky, etc.

Oberg is also a space consultant and on-air commentator to NBC News, Discovery Canada and the BBC.

In December 1990, Horizon, a British television science and philosophy television documentary program, aired a three-part series, "Red Star in Orbit," based on Oberg's book of the same name. WGBH Boston adapted the Horizon series for its Nova television science series, a three-part miniseries titled "The Russian Right Stuff," which aired in February 1991. HBO has optioned Red Star in Orbit for a future production. Also in 1991, Oberg launched a battle for official recognition of Robert Henry Lawrence, Jr. (1935–1967) as a United States astronaut; the United States Air Force officially recognized Lawrence in January 1997, six years after Oberg had begun his campaign.

In 1999, Oberg wrote Space Power Theory, sponsored by United States military as a part of an official campaign in changing perceptions of space warfare, specifically deployment and use of weapons in outer space, and its political implications. "In Oberg's view, space is not an extension of air warfare but is unique in itself."

James Oberg is an author of ten books in addition to several technical NASA publications.

He also wrote encyclopedia articles on space exploration in the World Book Encyclopedia, Britannica yearbook, Grolier and Academic American Encyclopedia.

Moon landing conspiracies 

Oberg was commissioned by NASA to write a rebuttal of Apollo Moon landing conspiracy theories. However, NASA dropped the project after ABC's World News Tonight program ran a story about it, claiming it was beneath NASA's dignity to respond to Moon landing denialists claims. Oberg has said that he still intends to pursue the project, "depending on successfully arranging new funding sources."

Oberg writes that Moon landing conspiracy theories are fueled by resentment of American culture by some countries. He gives the example of Cuba, where he claims many school teachers say the landing was a fraud. But besides this, the new wave of conspiracy theorists appear to use alternative publication methods to publicize their claims.

Oberg says that belief in the conspiracy is not the fault of the hoaxists, but rather of educators and people (including NASA) who should provide information to the public. NASA does not, in Oberg's opinion, provide an adequate reaction to the theorists' claims.

North Korean satellite launch inspection 
In April 2012 Oberg traveled to North Korea as an NBC space consultant to observe the launching of the Kwangmyŏngsŏng-3 satellite and determine whether it is a military launch. Together with a team of journalists he inspected the Sohae Satellite Launching Station, the Unha rocket and the satellite. According to Oberg, North Korea "showed everything but the important things" and did not manage to demonstrate peaceful intent.

UFO investigation 
James Oberg often writes about alleged UFO sightings, giving scientific explanations to seemingly extraterrestrial phenomena, or otherwise debunking them as hoaxes.

Oberg categorized UFO sightings (excluding those identified as hoaxes) into one of three groups:
 Super-High Plumes – rocket or missile plumes, especially lit by the Sun on a dark sky;
 Space "Dandruff" – ice flakes, fragments of insulation, etc. flying alongside a space vehicle, especially seen by backward-facing cameras;
 Twilight Shadowing – objects that move from shadow into sunlight in space appear as if coming from behind the clouds or from beyond the edge of the Earth.

List of UFO explanations

Russian pistol aboard ISS 

James Oberg wrote several articles as a publicity campaign to remove guns from the ISS. The TP-82 Cosmonaut survival pistol was stowed in the Soyuz emergency landing survival kit and was added there for hunting and self-defense after landing in inhospitable environment. It had three barrels and a folding stock that doubled as a shovel and contained a machete. The gun was only carried by Russian members of the ISS. Oberg suggested that it might be an invitation to a future disaster and proposed it to be put in a compartment accessible only from outside, after landing.

In 2014 Oberg asked Samantha Cristoforetti, an Italian ISS astronaut, about the pistol and she admitted the gun is removed from the list, or more precisely, it is still on the official list of kit contents, but the committee meets before every mission to review the list and vote to remove the pistol for the specific flight.

Private life 
Oberg has been married since 1969 and lives with his wife Alcestis in Dickinson, Texas. He has two grown sons (born 1977 and 1984).

He has a conversant knowledge of Russian, French and Latin, and has some familiarity with German, Swedish, Spanish, Kazakh and Japanese.

Awards and memberships
 First place in Goddard National Space Award (twice)
 1st and 2nd place awards from the American Society of Business Publication Editors (May 2000)
 The winner of the New Scientist award: Cutty Sark Whisky essay on UFO
 Fellow of the skeptical organization the Committee for Skeptical Inquiry
 Fellow of the British Interplanetary Society
 Fellow of the Russian Academy of Cosmonautics (the first foreign member)
 Fellow of the American Institute of Aeronautics and Astronautics

Bibliography

Popular publications

Other books 

 The Mars Conquest
 Red Stars in Orbit

Technical materials for NASA

 Space Shuttle Mission Control Center: Overview of Information and Decision Flows (for McDonnell Douglas);
 Rendezvous and Proximity Operations Handbook;
 History of Orbital Rendezvous;
 Flight Data File: Crew Procedures, STS-32 LDEF Retrieval;
 Console Handbook, Rendezvous Guidance and Procedures Officer;
 Training Guide, Rendezvous Guidance and Procedures Handbook

References

External links 
 Profile at jamesoberg.com

American male journalists
Journalists from New York City
United States Air Force airmen
1944 births
Living people
Military personnel from New York City
Northwestern University alumni
Ohio Wesleyan University alumni
University of New Mexico alumni
American skeptics
NASA people
UFO skeptics
Writers from New York City
People from Dickinson, Texas